Joel Thompson may refer to:

 Joel Thompson (politician) (1760–1843), United States Representative from New York
 Joel Thompson (composer)
 Joel Thompson (rugby league) (born 1988), Australian rugby league footballer